Alonso García-Tamés (born January 21, 1959) is the former CEO of the National Bank of Public Works and Services (Banobras) and General Director of Operations of the Central Bank of Mexico.

Education and career
García-Tamés graduated with a bachelor's degree in Actuarial Science from the Universidad Anahuac.

In December 2006 García-Tamés was appointed CEO of the National Bank of Public Works and Services, development bank dedicated to promote infrastructure investment in Mexico through sub-national government lending, project finance, and technical assistance.

García-Tamés speaks at conferences related to debt management policy, monetary policy, exchange rate management policy, payment systems and international asset management.

Boards of Directors
García-Tamés has been a board member for several banks and regulation agencies:
 Banco Nacional de Obras y Servicios Públicos, S.N.C  (National Bank of Public Works and Services)
 Nacional Financiera
 Comisión Nacional Bancaria y de Valores (Securities and Exchange Commission)
 Banco Nacional de Comercio Exterior, S.N.C.
 Financiera Rural
 Sociedad Hipotecaria Federal
 Comisión Nacional de Seguros y Fianzas
 North American Development Bank
 Banco del Ahorro Nacional y Servicios Financieros, S.N.C.

External links
National Bank of Public Works and Services (BANOBRAS) 

Living people
Mexican bankers
1959 births